One is a Christian progressive rock concept album by multi-instrumentalist Neal Morse and his fourth studio album. Released in 2004, this was released as both a single-CD album and a special edition double-CD with deleted tracks and cover songs. The album is based on the Parable of the Prodigal Son.

The band is Neal, Mike Portnoy (ex-Dream Theater), and Randy George (Ajalon) with guest Phil Keaggy.

Track listing
Credits adapted from CD booklet.

Restored track list
This is the track list as described by Neal Morse with bonus tracks in their original place.

Critical reception
In 2018, One was ranked number 3 all time in the Neal Morse discography behind Sola Scriptura and The Similitude of a Dream.

Personnel
Neal Morse – lead vocals, Keyboards, Guitars
Mike Portnoy – drums
Randy George – bass guitar

Technical personnel
 Rich Mouser - mixing

Additional musicians and special guests
 Phil Keaggy – Electric guitar solo in "The Creation" at 8:25, Acoustic guitar solo in "The Man's Gone (Reprise)", 2nd Lead Vocals on Cradle to the Grave.
 Chris Carmichael – Violin, Viola, and Background Vocals
 Gene Miller – Additional Vocals
 Rick Altizer – Additional Vocals
 Michael Thurman – French Horn
 Rachel Rigdon – Violin
 Hannah Vanderpool – Cello
 Dave Jacques – String Bass
 Jim Hoke – Saxophone
 Neil Rosengarden – Trumpet
 Bill Huber – Trombone
 Glenn Caruba – Percussion
 Aaron Marshall – Background Vocals
 Missy Hale – Background Vocals

Release details
2004, UK, Inside Out Music/Spv ?, Release Date 8 November 2004, CD
2004, UK, Inside Out Music/Spv 6-93723-01182-0, Release Date 8 November 2004, CD (Special Edition 2-CD set)
2004, USA, Radiant Records/Metal Blade ?, Release Date 2 November 2004, CD

References

Neal Morse albums
2004 albums
Concept albums